In geometry, an epitrochoid ( or ) is a roulette traced by a point attached to a circle of radius  rolling around the outside of a fixed circle of radius , where the point is at a distance  from the center of the exterior circle.

The parametric equations for an epitrochoid are

The parameter  is geometrically the polar angle of the center of the exterior circle. (However,  is not the polar angle of the point  on the epitrochoid.)

The classic Spirograph toy traces out epitrochoid and hypotrochoid curves.

The orbits of planets in the once popular geocentric Ptolemaic system are epitrochoids (see deferent and epicycle).

The orbit of the moon, when centered around the sun, approximates an epitrochoid.

The combustion chamber of the Wankel engine is an epitrochoid.

See also
 Cycloid
 Cyclogon
 Epicycloid
 Hypocycloid
 Hypotrochoid
 Spirograph
 List of periodic functions
 Rosetta (orbit)
 Apsidal precession

References

External links
Epitrochoid generator

Visual Dictionary of Special Plane Curves on Xah Lee 李杀网
Interactive simulation of the geocentric graphical representation of planet paths 

Plot Epitrochoid -- GeoFun

Roulettes (curve)

ja:トロコイド#外トロコイド